Tveitsund is a village in Nissedal municipality, Norway. The urban area Tveitsund, which consists of Tveitsund and Treungen, has a population of 361.

References

Villages in Vestfold og Telemark